Bucculatrix lavaterella is a moth in the family Bucculatricidae. It was described by Pierre Millière in 1865. It is found in France and on Sardinia and Sicily.

Gallery

References

Natural History Museum Lepidoptera generic names catalog

Bucculatricidae
Moths described in 1865
Taxa named by Pierre Millière
Moths of Europe
Leaf miners